The Emu Plains JRLFC, colloquially known as just Emu, is a Rugby league club in the Penrith, New South Wales District. The club fields both Junior and Senior teams with players starting as early as 4 years old. The club colours are red, white and blue.

History
 Although officially formed in 1967, the club was around as early as 1912. The first evidence of rugby league in Penrith comes from newspaper reports in April 1912 of a match between ‘Glenbrook Rovers' and a combined ‘Penrith and Emus' team at the Penrith Showground. Known as the Emu Wanderers, they joined the Western Districts Junior League. It included teams from Parramatta, Auburn and Lidcombe. In 1913, the Western Districts entered a team in the Presidents Cup competition. The majority of the team was made up of players from Emu Plains and Penrith, the first time players from the district competed in a competition run by the New South Wales Rugby League.
By the 1920s, the Western Districts League had a sub-office in Blacktown and the competition included teams from Auburn, Lidcombe, a number around Parramatta, Wentworthville, St. Marys, Blacktown, Riverstone, Windsor, Emu Plains and Penrith. 
The Western Districts Junior Rugby League was gaining strength, as Emu Plains took A and B grade teams to Riverstone where they won 47-0 and 5-0 respectively.
In 1927 Emu Plains decided to field a private team in the Blue Mountains competition - under the banner of "Emu Gravel Company". "They were big buggers, tough as bags" said Jack Lack.

Modern day
 With more than 30 teams from Under 6's through to A Grade, the club is one of few in the area that accepts four-year-olds. Emu Plains has a very competitive rivalry with Penrith Brothers, every year since 2009 the two clubs have a "retro day". The Emu club has had varied success, with teams in the finals most years, and the Emu Plains A Grade team defeating St Mary's Saints to win the 1st Division A Grade competition in 2009.

Colour origins
Emu Plains' colours were originally blue and white and because of this they were commonly known as the Emu Blues. By the 1960s, there were multiple teams in blue and white, including Newtown, Canterbury and a number of Junior League clubs such as the Penrith Warratahs. So Emu added red to their uniform, and this is the tri-colour the club has today.

Jerseys

Notable people

Emu Plains JRLFC has produced multiple top grade NRL players including: 
Percy Dukes, local cricketer and all round sportsman, also claims an Emu Plains JRLFC origin.
Danny Galea (A Grade 1996-1998)
Chris Levy (1990–1995) 
Shane Rodney (U/17 2000) 
Luke Rooney (1989–1995) 
Andrew Ryan (C Grade 1995)
Hilton Sheens (cousin of George Sheens, grandfather of Tim Sheens
Tulsen Tollett (1988–1990)
Trent Waterhouse (A Grade 2001)

Former top grade players that have coached/trained/played in a side at Emu Plains include 
"Bluff" Colless, relative of former Penrith Mayor Alfred Colless, is thought to have been linked with Emu Plains.
John Farragher
Neville Glover
Peter Lewis
Peter Kelly
Lenny Stacker
Colin van der Voort
Barry Walker

Footnotes
1.http://www.rl1908.com/Clubs/Penrith-Panthers.htm
2. http://penrith-press.whereilive.com.au/sport/story/big-things-ahead-for-emu-boys/

References

Lester, Gary and Prichard, Greg, Bound for Glory: Story of the Penrith Panthers (1992) .

Rugby league teams in New South Wales
Junior rugby league
Rugby clubs established in 1967
1967 establishments in Australia
Emu Plains, New South Wales